Castejón is a town and municipality located in the province and autonomous community of Navarre, northern Spain.

Castejón is home to Spain's largest photovoltaic power plant (2.44 MWp), which opened in 2006.

References

External links

 Castejón  in the Bernardo Estornés Lasa - Auñamendi Encyclopedia (Euskomedia Fundazioa) 

Municipalities in Navarre